Ali Verdilu (also Romanized as ‘Alī Verdlū; also known as Allāh Verdīlū) is a village in Ojarud-e Sharqi Rural District, Muran District, Germi County, Ardabil Province, Iran. At the 2006 census, its population was 33, in 8 families.

References 

Towns and villages in Germi County